Göteborgsvarvet is an annual half marathon running competition in Gothenburg,  Sweden (often called the Gothenburg Half Marathon in English). 
It is the largest annual running competition in the world in terms of entries, with its 62,000 entries for the Göteborgsvarvet competition on 18 May 2013. In 2016, 64,500 people entered the race. The youngest runner was 17 years old and the oldest female runner 83 and male runner 87.

Its name is a word play; the Swedish language-word "varv" has a double meaning and can mean both lap and shipyard ("[skepps]varv"), as Gothenburg historically has been known as a shipyard town (Gothenburgers also particularly enjoy word-play-humour). 

The race takes place in May, and has been organised annually since 1980. It starts outside, and finishes in, the old athletics arena Slottsskogsvallen in the Slottsskogen park. It takes off northwards over the large suspension bridge Älvsborg Bridge, follows the north bank to the Göta älv river, and returns over the Göta Älv Bridge, goes through the inner city, before reaching the finish.

The race has hosted the Swedish national championship race on five occasions (1995, 2007, 2009, 2012, 2016 and 2017).

The 2020 and 2021 editions were both cancelled because of the Coronavirus pandemic.

Past winners

Key:

References
Hultman, Hans & Monti, Dave (24 May 2011). Göteborgsvarvet Half Marathon. Association of Road Racing Statisticians. Retrieved on 30 July 2011.

External links

 Official website

Half marathons
International sports competitions in Gothenburg
Recurring sporting events established in 1980
International athletics competitions hosted by Sweden
1980 establishments in Sweden
May sporting events
Spring (season) events in Sweden
Athletics in Gothenburg